Amber Clarke is an Australian rules footballer playing for the Essendon Football Club in the AFL Women's (AFLW). Clarke was recruited by Essendon with the 4th pick in the 2022 AFL Women's draft.

Early life
Clarke played junior football for the Dandenong Stingrays in the NAB League Girls where she starred, winning both the Stingrays' and the league's best and fairest awards after a season which she averaged 1.8 goals and 17.4 disposals a game. She also won the award for best on ground in the team's loss in the grand final, after collecting 28 disposals and two goals. She won the league best and fairest by a solitary vote ahead of future  draftee Charlotte Baskaran, polling 20 votes in total.

AFL Women's career
Clarke debuted for the Essendon in the opening round of the AFL Women's season seven, playing in their inaugural team which faced  at Marvel Stadium. On debut, Clarke collected 7 disposals and 3 marks.

Statistics
Updated to the end of S7 (2022).

|-
| S7 (2022) ||  || 33
| 10 || 2 || 2 || 78 || 17 || 95 || 23 || 15 || 0.2 || 0.2 || 7.8 || 1.7 || 9.5 || 2.3 || 1.5 || 
|- class=sortbottom
! colspan=3 | Career
! 10 !! 2 !! 2 !! 78 !! 17 !! 95 !! 23 !! 15 !! 2.0 !! 2.0 !! 7.8 !! 1.7 !! 9.5 !! 2.3 !! 1.5 !! 0
|}

References

External links
 Amber Clarke at AustralianFootball.com
 

2004 births
Living people
Essendon Football Club (AFLW) players
Australian rules footballers from Victoria (Australia)